Shokken (in Japanese:食券) are a type of Japanese ticket machine/vending machine.

Information 

Shokken machines were first seen in 1926 at Tokyo StationThere are currently over 43,000 Shokken machines in Japan. 

Shokken are often found in  restaurants,  cafe's,  fast-food restaurants and other establishments. A typical Shokken machine features buttons where the customer can select an item, a  coin slot, where the customer can pay for the item and a  printer where the customer can receive their receipt. Upon receiving their receipt, the customer can then exchange their receipt for their purchased item. Shokken machines can be standalone machines and sometimes are located on  countertops and tables. Shokken machines can also be modified for other uses.

Companies often use Shokken machines as they can reduce the amount of staff needed, reduce theft, reduce the  turnover rate and can help reduce ordering errors. While useful, Shokken machines are not associated with a  fine dining atmosphere, as they are often seen in inexpensive restaurants such as  Matsuya, Yoshinoya and  Sukiya. Shokken machines also can break and limit customized orders.

References

Dispensers
Vending machines
Retail formats
Commercial machines